Pyotr Yakovlevich Shevyryov (6.23(7.5).1863 – 5.8(20).1887) was a Russian revolutionary, member of Narodnaya Volya.

In 1883, Shevyrev enrolled in the University of Kharkiv and later transferred to St.Petersburg University. In the winter of 1885—1886, he organized an illegal club called "Student Union" (Союз землячеств, or Soyuz zemlyachestv). In the late 1886, Shevyrev and Aleksandr Ulyanov created the "Terrorist Faction" of Narodnaya Volya, which would be responsible for devising the attempted assassination of Alexander III on March 1, 1887. In February 1887, Shevyrev left for the Crimea due to his tuberculosis. 

Shevyrev was arrested in Yalta on March 7. On April 19, at St. Petersburg, he was sentenced to death by hanging during the Pervomartovtsi trial. He was executed at the fortress of Shlisselburg some two weeks later.

References

1863 births
1887 deaths
Politicians from Kharkiv
People from Kharkov Governorate
Saint Petersburg State University alumni
Russian revolutionaries
Executed revolutionaries
People executed by the Russian Empire by hanging
Executed Russian people
Executed Ukrainian people
19th-century executions by the Russian Empire